The Bishop's Palace at Wiveliscombe was a former bishops residence in Somerset, England. Built in the 13th century, it served as a residence for the Bishops of the Diocese of Bath and Wells.

The foundations of the bishop's palace were found in 2021.

References

Episcopal palaces in England
Diocese of Bath and Wells
Wiveliscombe